Canal 4 is a private Costa Rican television channel, owned and operated by Repretel. It was the second television station acquired by Repretel in Costa Rica. The station broadcasts on channel 6.2 which the frequency is used by sister channel Canal 6 due to the original frequency being impossible to convert to digital until 2021.

History
The station was acquired from TV Azteca, when the Mexican company decided to sell their Latin American television stations in Costa Rica, Guatemala, El Salvador and Chile to invest in their mobile services in Mexico. At the time of the sale, TV Azteca still owed money to original owners and responsible of Channel 9 operations. Since Repretel was sub-leasing Channel 9 from TV Azteca at the time, the process of the sale was seamless.

Repretel took control of the station on March 13, 2000, defavoring Canal 9, which had become a repeater.

At this time, the channel's schedule consisted primarily of entertainment shows (mostly from Telemundo and Univisión) primarily aimed at women. On June 9, 2003, it interchanged schedules with Repretel 11 and the daily block of cartoons transferred to this channel.

Programming
Repretel 4 programming consists in kids shows, cartoons, anime, juvenile soap operas, daily nightly movie and Caso Cerrado.The station has low advertising demand and depends on infomercials and Repretel 6 ads to keep running.
Some programs of the channel are: America’s Next Top Model, Survivor, NCIS, Alerta Cobra, Highlander: The Series, Funniest Pets and People, The Planet’s Funniest Animals, Animal Atlas, SAF3, Numb3rs, Leverage.

References

External links
 Official website

Television stations in Costa Rica
Spanish-language television stations
Television channels and stations established in 1981